Chemical Hearts is a 2020 American romantic drama film  written, produced, and directed by Richard Tanne, based on the novel Our Chemical Hearts by Krystal Sutherland. It stars Austin Abrams and Lili Reinhart. It was released on August 21, 2020, by Amazon Studios.

Plot
Teenager Henry Page considers himself a hopeless romantic but has never fallen in love. He aspires to be a writer and to be chosen as editor of his high school newspaper. The newspaper's faculty advisor disappoints him by making him share the editor position with Grace Town, a new student in his class. Grace is physically disabled walking with a limp and using a cane. She is also sullen and morose and initially rejects Henry's attempts to talk to her.

After missing his bus on the first day, Henry and Grace wind up walking home along the same route. Although distant at first, Grace relents and offers to drive Henry home once they reach her house. However, she refuses to drive and has him drive her car and leave it at his house. The next day, a mysterious middle-aged man retrieves her car without speaking to Henry.

As Grace begins to let Henry into her life, she shows him an abandoned factory with a pool containing koi fish. He falls in love with her despite her mixed signals and obvious indications that she is emotionally traumatized. He follows her one day and finds her at the grave of a teenager. Upon further investigation, he learns that the dead teenager was killed in a car crash and that Grace had been in the car when it happenedcausing her disability and leading to her changing schools.

Their romance peaks at a Halloween party, after which they have sex. It is Henry's first time. They have a romantic few days together, but Grace is still troubled.

On the anniversary of the car crash, Henry goes to her house and learns that she has been living in the room of her deceased boyfriend, with his mother and father (the man who had picked up her car earlier). She finds Henry there and they argue as she is clearly still in love with her dead boyfriend. Henry cannot handle this information and they break up.

One day, after being told by Dom’s father that Grace has gone missing, Henry finds her in the koi pool, wearing what was to have been her wedding dress. He takes her back to her home.

As Henry's and Grace's senior year comes to an end, they avoid talking to one another at the school. Grace leaves the newspaper after taking some time off school. After the last issue of the newspaper is released, to which Henry has contributed a heartfelt essay about the biochemistry of teenagers, they meet in a school hallway. Their encounter is an emotional one and they hug, but then go their separate ways.

Cast 
 Austin Abrams as Henry Page
 Lili Reinhart as Grace Town
 Sarah Jones as Sadie
 Adhir Kalyan as Kem Sharma
 Bruce Altman as Toby
 Kara Young as Lola
 Coral Peña as Cora
 C.J. Hoff as Murray 
 Catherine Curtin as Sarah

Production
In June 2016, Awesomeness Films acquired the screen rights to Chemical Hearts. In June 2019, it was announced Lili Reinhart and Austin Abrams had joined the cast of the film, with Richard Tanne directing from a screenplay he wrote. Principal photography began in June 2019 in New Jersey.

Release
It was released on August 21, 2020 on Amazon Prime Video.

Reception
According to review aggregator Rotten Tomatoes, 60% of 95 critics gave the film positive reviews with an average rating of 5.7/10. Out of 22 "Top Critics", 70% gave the film positive reviews. The site's critics consensus reads, "For better and for worse, Chemical Hearts captures the well-worn ups and downs of melodramatic teenage love - and countless other films about it." Metacritic assigned the film a weighted average score of 57 out of 100, based on 16 critics, indicating "mixed or average reviews".

Sheila O'Malley of RogerEbert.com described the film as "sneakily subversive," and "very unpredictable," writing that, "there's much to be said for what Tanne has pulled off in Chemical Hearts, for his gentle and measured approach. You actually feel like you have been through something by the end." She added that "Lili Reinhart is a revelation. She has such gravitas as an actress," and that, "Abrams is a thoughtful presence, and best when he's forced to deal with her unpredictable behavior. Watch his reactions. He's paying such close attention to her, trying to read her face. These two young actors make this bond make sense."

San Francisco Chronicle's G. Allen Johnson concluded his review by asserting that "what makes Chemical Hearts so good is it’s unafraid of its feelings. It tackles complicated emotional issues such as depression, suicide, sex and love with a straightforward honesty. For once, a film about young people is completely free of snark and irony."

Writing for Time, Stephanie Zacharek opined that the film "captures the joy and agony—and the lasting scars—of teenage romance."

David Ehrlich, reviewing for IndieWire, praised Tanne's direction of the film, writing that he employed "a more patient and open-ended aesthetic than you’d expect to find in a YA adaptation; shot on a 35mm stock that can make an entire bedroom vibrate with potential, some entire scenes are captured in just a handful of static medium-wide shots that aren’t afraid to set these characters adrift in a vast sea of their own feelings."  He wrote that the film "has an uncanny way of capturing the basic combustibility of teenage feelings."

The film was nominated for “Best Streaming Movie of the Year” at the 2021 SEC Awards.

Youth-oriented online media platform The Second Angle placed the film at number 5 on its list of "Ultimate 25 movies every girl must watch before turning 25."

Comic Book Resources listed the film as #3 in their article, "10 Best Coming-of-Age Movies On Prime Video," writing that it "dives deep into complicated themes like sadness, love, affection, sex, and regret and showcases them honestly and beautifully. There is no pretense in Chemical Hearts, and Grace and Austin's bond is an unforgettable one."

References

External links
 

2020 films
2020s coming-of-age drama films
2020 romantic drama films
Amazon Studios films
American coming-of-age drama films
American romantic drama films
Films based on American novels
Films based on young adult literature
Films scored by Stephen James Taylor
Films set in New Jersey
Films shot in New Jersey
Amazon Prime Video original films
2020s English-language films
2020s American films